Cole Desmond Kpekawa (born 20 May 1996) is an English professional footballer who plays as a defender for Maidenhead United.

Club career

Queens Park Rangers
Born in Blackpool, Kpekawa came through the Academy at Queens Park Rangers. He signed a two-year scholarship with the club in July 2012 at the age of 16. On 2 April 2014, he signed his first professional contract on a one-year deal.

Kpekawa joined League One side Colchester United for an initial one-month loan deal on 20 November 2014. He made his professional debut against Coventry City at the Colchester Community Stadium in a 1–0 League One defeat on 22 November. After making four appearances for Colchester, his loan was extended for a further month until 24 January 2015. He made six appearances for Colchester, four in League One and two in the FA Cup.

On 19 March 2015, he was loaned to League Two side Portsmouth until the end of the season. He made his debut on 21 March in a 1–0 defeat against AFC Wimbledon where he played the full 90-minutes. He was recalled from his loan at Portsmouth by QPR on 20 April having made two first-team appearances.

On returning to QPR, Kpekawa made his debut for the club as an 85th-minute substitute for Yun Suk-young in a 5–1 Premier League defeat to Leicester City on 24 May 2015.

On 19 November 2015, he joined League Two side Leyton Orient in an initial one-month loan deal. He made his debut two days later on 21 November as an early substitute in a 3–2 league win against York City. His loan was extended in December 2015, and again in January 2016 to remain with the O's until 1 March 2016. He was recalled from his loan by parent club QPR on 1 February 2016 after making nine appearances for Orient.

Barnsley
After struggling to hold down a first-team place at Queens Park Rangers, Championship rivals Barnsley signed Kpekawa for an undisclosed fee, thought to be in the region of £450,000, on 31 August 2016. He agreed a three-year contract with the club. He made his Barnsley debut on 10 September 2016 as a late substitute in their 2–1 win at Preston North End. However, after only four starts, Kpekawa found himself out of the first-team picture as manager Paul Heckingbottom preferred to play right-back Andy Yiadom out of position at left-back, while the club coaches worked with Kpekawa to suit a more central role.

Colchester United
Having made only seven league appearances for Barnsley, Kpekawa made a permanent return to his former loan club Colchester United on 17 July 2017. He signed an initial one-year deal for an undisclosed fee. He made his second Colchester United debut on 5 August as a substitute in their 3–1 defeat at Accrington Stanley.

After failing to establish himself in Colchester's first-team and having not made an appearance since January 2018, Kpekawa left the club by mutual consent on 13 April 2018.

St Mirren
On 13 July 2018, it was announced that Kpekawa had signed a two-year deal with St Mirren after a successful trial period with the Scottish Premiership side. Kpekawa made his debut for the club on the same day, starting in a 0–0 draw with Kilmarnock in the Scottish League Cup. After failing to break into the first team at Saints, he was released by mutual consent in January 2019.

AS Trenčín
On 20 August 2019, Kpekawa joined Fortuna Liga side AS Trenčín on a multi-year contract following a spell with Billericay Town.

Kpekawa made his Fortuna Liga debut against Zemplín Michalovce on 14 September 1019. In his debut match, Kpekawa was sent off in the 9th minute of the match, after he broke a leg of 18 year old Matej Trusa. Later that day, Trusa was diagnosed with a double fracture of his right leg. It was expected to take approximately 12 months until he recovers. Trusa, however, managed to return in 6 months. On 20 September 2019, Kpekawa was suspended for six months by the disciplinary committee of Slovak Football Association for his foul on Trusa.

Non-League
On 30 October 2020, Kpekawa signed for National League South club Chelmsford City.

On 2 June 2021, Chelmsford announced fellow National League South side Hemel Hempstead Town had signed Kpekawa.

On 27 May 2022, Kpekawa joined National League club Maidenhead United.

International career
Kpekawa was born in England and is of Sierra Leone descent. On 3 September 2015, following an injury to Kean Bryan of Manchester City, Kpekawa was called up to the England under-20 squad for their match against the Czech Republic. Two days later he made his international debut as the Czech Republic were defeated 5–0. He featured for the full 90-minutes.

He was again called up to the under-20 squad for the Mercedes-Benz Elite Cup in Germany, where England would play the Netherlands, Turkey and Germany. He started in England's 2–1 win against Turkey and featured as a substitute in their 1–0 defeat by Germany as England ended the competition as runners-up.

Style of play
Kpekawa primarily plays as a left-back but can also operate as a centre-back. Barnsley manager Paul Heckingbottom described him as "tall, quick, strong, with a good left foot".

Career statistics

References

External links

England profile at The Football Association

1996 births
Living people
Sportspeople from Blackpool
English footballers
English people of Ghanaian descent
Black British sportspeople
Association football defenders
Association football fullbacks
England youth international footballers
Queens Park Rangers F.C. players
Colchester United F.C. players
Portsmouth F.C. players
Leyton Orient F.C. players
Barnsley F.C. players
St Mirren F.C. players
Billericay Town F.C. players
AS Trenčín players
Chelmsford City F.C. players
Hemel Hempstead Town F.C. players
Maidenhead United F.C. players
English Football League players
Premier League players
Slovak Super Liga players
Scottish Professional Football League players
National League (English football) players
Expatriate footballers in Slovakia
English expatriate sportspeople in Slovakia
English expatriate footballers